The Welterweight competition at the 2013 AIBA World Boxing Championships was held from 16–26 October 2013. Boxers were limited to a weight of 69 kilograms.

Medalists

Seeds

  Fred Evans (quarterfinals)
  Marvin Cabrera (third round)
  Gabriel Maestre (semifinals)
  Daniyar Yeleussinov (champion)
  Vincenzo Mangiacapre (quarterfinals)
  Alexander Besputin (quarterfinals)
  Custio Clayton (third round)
  Roberto de Queiroz (second round)
  Arajik Marutjan (semifinals)
  Ilyas Abbadi (second round)

Draw

Finals

Top half

Section 1

Section 2

Bottom half

Section 3

Section 4

References
Draw

2013 AIBA World Boxing Championships